Estadio Florentino Oropeza is a multi-use stadium in San Felipe, Venezuela.  It is currently used mostly for football matches, on club level by Yaracuyanos FC of the Venezuelan Primera División. The stadium has a capacity of 10,000 spectators.

References

Football venues in Venezuela
Buildings and structures in Yaracuy
San Felipe, Yaracuy